All Gummed Up is a 1947 short subject directed by Jules White starring American slapstick comedy team The Three Stooges (Moe Howard, Larry Fine and Shemp Howard). It is the 103rd entry in the series released by Columbia Pictures starring the comedians, who released 190 shorts for the studio between 1934 and 1959.

Plot
The Stooges operate a local drugstore whose landlord, the cantankerous Amos Flint (Emil Sitka), informs them their lease is about to expire. Larry protests that the trio have had their establishment for a decade, and do not want to leave. As the four bicker, Flint's elderly wife Cerina (Florence Lake) enters the store, only to be berated by Flint for being an old hag. "25 years is enough," he coldly confirms. After he storms off, the boys take to the frail Cerina, who begins to weep that ever since she lost her beauty, Amos had threatened to leave. Both saddened and incensed, the Stooges offer Cerina their spare room in the back. Shemp, seeing this, hatches a plan to invent a "Fountain of Youth" to restore Cerina (now played by Christine McIntyre) to her stunning beauty. Deeming the idea "tremendous, colossal and putrid," the Stooges flee to their pharmaceutical lab and mix together a powerful serum.

After several false tries, the trio give Cerina a taste of their Fountain of Youth, and she transforms into a fetching beauty right before their eyes. Several days later, Amos comes storming into the Stooges' drug store only to see the youthful Cerina flaunting her newfound beauty. Amos quickly reneges on his threat to evict the Stooges and even gives them the deed to their store in exchange for a dose of the serum himself. The Stooges proceed to mix a new batch on the spot, resulting in Amos becoming a baby.

The following day, Cerina celebrates her return to youth by preparing a Marshmallow Jumbo layer cake. Shemp is assigned to hunt down marshmallows but inadvertently retrieves bubble gum. The resulting celebration then finds the Stooges and Cerina blowing bubbles after every bite, with Shemp getting two bubbles out of his ears.

Cast

Credited
 Moe Howard as Moe
 Larry Fine as Larry
 Shemp Howard as Shemp
 Emil Sitka as Amos Flint
 Norman Ollestad as Baby Amos (uncredited)
 Christine McIntyre Cerina Flint

Uncredited
 Cy Schindell as Man with prescription
 Victor Travers as Bubblegum customer
 Symona Boniface as Woman who loses her dress
 Al Thompson as Fountain pen customer
 Judy Malcolm as Light bulb customer
 Michael Towne as Fishing rod customer
 Dian Fauntelle as Unnamed woman (In deleted scene from picture)

Production notes
All Gummed Up was filmed from April 23–24, 1947. It was remade in 1953 as Bubble Trouble, using ample recycled footage from the original. Although Stooge critic Jon Solomon contends that the remake has a better story flow than the original, that sentiment is not shared by fans.

This entry is one of the few to present the trio as competent and respectable professionals, as opposed to incompetent blue-collar laborers.

References

External links 
.
All Gummed Up at threestooges.net

1947 films
Columbia Pictures short films
1947 comedy films
1947 short films
American slapstick comedy films
The Three Stooges films
American black-and-white films
Films directed by Jules White
American comedy short films
1940s English-language films
1940s American films